Kirovsk, is a city in Luhansk Oblast (province) of Ukraine. It is incorporated as a city of oblast significance. Population: , . The city was renamed Holubivka by Ukrainian authorities in 2016; however, as the settlement is under the control of the Luhansk People's Republic, who have not recognised this, the renaming has been largely symbolic. Since the 2022 annexation referendums in Russian-occupied Ukraine, Russia has claimed the settlement as part of Russia.

History
The settlement was founded in 1764 as a village named Golubovka by the Russian colonel and native of Serbia, Peter Golub. Its history follows closely the history of industrial development in the Eastern Ukraine. When coal mines were developed in the area, the village became known as Golubovskiy Rudnik. It reached its peak size in the 1980s. When the area was recaptured from Nazi Germany in 1944, the settlement was renamed Kirovsk after the former mayor of Leningrad. In 1962 the settlement was granted city rights.The landscape around the town is notable for pyramid-shaped manmade hills, by-products of the coal mining industry. 

Since 2014, Kirovsk has been located in the territory of the unrecognised Luhansk People's Republic and is not controlled by the Ukrainian authorities.

Demographics 
As of the Ukrainian Census of 2001:

 Ethnicity
 Ukrainians: 56.9%
 Russians: 40.7%
 Belarusians: 1%

 Language
Russian: 84.6%
Ukrainian: 14.9%
Belarusian: 0.2%

Kirovsk Municipality
The Kirovsk Municipality represented by the Kirovsk City council consists of two urban settlements (towns, Donetskyi and Krynychanske Chervonohvardiiske) and two rural settlements (hamlets, Krynychne and Tavrychanske) that belonged to Chervonohvardiyske Municipality.

Notable People 
Maksym Dehtyarov, professional football player of the club Desna Chernihiv in  Ukrainian Premier League.

References 

Cities in Luhansk Oblast
Populated places established in 1764
Cities of regional significance in Ukraine
Populated places established in the Russian Empire
Soviet toponymy in Ukraine
1764 establishments in the Russian Empire
City name changes in Ukraine